Robert M. Nemkovich (born November 27, 1942) is an American prelate and was the sixth Prime Bishop of the Polish National Catholic Church, elected by the twenty-first General Synod of this denomination in 2002 and serving until 2010.

Biography
Nemkovich was born in Grove City, Pennsylvania and grew up in Youngstown, Ohio. He graduated from North High School in 1960 and from Youngstown State University in 1964. He attended Savonarola Theological Seminary in Scranton, Pennsylvania and was ordained a priest in 1966. Before being elected Prime Bishop on 8 October, 2002, he served as Bishop of the church's western diocese from 1993 to 2002.

He lives in Chicago. His son, the Rev. Robert M. Nemkovich Jr., is also a priest.

References

Prime Bishops of the Polish National Catholic Church
Bishops of the Polish National Catholic Church
American Polish National Catholics
American people of Polish descent
Youngstown State University alumni
People from Grove City, Pennsylvania
1942 births
Living people